Khomam (Khumam), is a city of Gilan province and the center of Khomam county. The city of Khomam is located on the road connecting the two major and tourist cities of Gilan province, namely Rasht and Anzali. According to the police, Rasht to Khomam has been introduced as the second busiest road in the province in 2015. Khomam city is the center of Khomam County, which is upgraded from a District to a County and separated from Rasht County in 2021. Khomam is the nearest city to the center of Gilan province (Rasht), the distance from Khomam to Rasht is about 7 km and to Anzali is 15 km. Khomam is connected to the Caspian Sea in the north through the coast of Jafrud Bala (1.5 km long) and is considered a border town, and in the west it is connected to the east coast of Anzali Lagoon through Dahaneh Sar-e Shijan village and Jirsar-e Baqer Khaleh village. 7 villages in the suburbs of Khomam are part of the Anzali Free Zone.

References

Populated places in Rasht County

Cities in Gilan Province